Tartu Kalev may refer to:
 Tartu Kalev-Välk, Estonian ice hockey club, located in Tartu 
 Tartu Kalev (later ), Estonian former football club, located in Tartu
 Tartu Sports Association Kalev (:et)
 FA Tartu Kalev, Estonian football club